Pete Julian (born May 11, 1971) is an American track and field coach for the Nike Union Athletics Club and former assistant coach of the Nike Oregon Project. Julian was once a professional distance runner representing the United States.

Athletes under Pete Julian:

 Suguru Osako (Japan)
 Shannon Rowbury (USA)
 Donavan Brazier (USA)
 Konstanze Klosterhalfen (Germany)
 Jessica Hull (Australia)
 Raevyn Rogers (USA)
 Alexa Efraimson (USA)
 Jordan Hasay (USA)
Charlie Hunter (Australia)
Sinclaire Johnson(USA)
Ella Donaghu (USA)
McKenna Keegan (USA)
Michaela Meyer (USA)

As an athlete for Adidas, Julian won a bronze medal in the 10,000m at the 1999 Pan American Games and was selected to represent the United States at the 1999 World Championships in Athletics in the same event, where he finished 22nd. He also competed at the 1997 and 1998 IAAF World Cross Country Championships.

Julian began his coaching career working at Metro State  in 2005 before taking over the  Washington State University cross country team in 2009, taking the team to the NCAA Division I Men's Cross Country Championship. He later joined as an assistant coach to the Nike Oregon Project (NOP) in September, 2012. In December, 2022, Julian founded the Union Athletics Club.

Julian is a multiple-time cancer survivor, having survived stomach cancer via an experimental treatment.

Major international competitions

National competitions

External links

References 

Living people
1971 births
American male long-distance runners
American male marathon runners
Washington State Cougars cross country coaches
American track and field coaches
Athletes (track and field) at the 1999 Pan American Games
Pan American Games track and field athletes for the United States
Pan American Games bronze medalists for the United States
Pan American Games medalists in athletics (track and field)
World Athletics Championships athletes for the United States
Medalists at the 1999 Pan American Games